Russell Henley (born April 12, 1989) is an American professional golfer who plays on the PGA Tour.

Amateur career
Born in Macon, Georgia, Henley attended Stratford Academy in Macon. He played college golf for four years at the University of Georgia in Athens. He won the 2010 Haskins Award as the most outstanding collegiate golfer and  played in the U.S. Open and tied for the low amateur (with Scott Langley). He also played in two Nationwide Tour events in 2010: the Nationwide Children's Hospital Invitational and the Stadion Athens Classic at UGA.

In 2011, Henley won the Stadion Classic at UGA on the Nationwide Tour, only the second amateur to win on that tour; Daniel Summerhays was the first in 2007. The tournament was played on the University of Georgia's home course. Henley represented the U.S. that year at the Walker Cup and Palmer Cup competitions.

Professional career
Henley made his professional debut at the Nationwide Tour's Soboba Golf Classic in September 2011. A year later, he won the Chiquita Classic, defeating Patrick Cantlay and Morgan Hoffmann in a playoff. In October 2012, he won his second title of the year at the Winn-Dixie Jacksonville Open. On the 72nd hole, he made  putt for birdie to force playoff against B.J. Staten. He made par on the first playoff hole to earn the win. He graduated from the Web.com Tour (formerly the Nationwide Tour), to the PGA Tour, by finishing third on the money list in 2012.

PGA Tour
Henley became the first PGA Tour rookie to win his debut in 12 years with a record-setting performance at the Sony Open in Hawaii in January 2013. He finished at 256 (–24), breaking the Sony Open scoring record by four shots. It was the second-lowest score for a 72-hole tournament in PGA Tour history, two shots behind Tommy Armour III at the Valero Texas Open in 2003. The win gave Henley an invitation to the Masters and the PGA Championship.

Henley won his second PGA Tour title at the Honda Classic in Florida in March 2014. In difficult conditions on Sunday, Henley shot a two-over-par round of 72 to make it into a four-man playoff with Russell Knox, Rory McIlroy, and Ryan Palmer. At the first playoff hole, the par-five 18th, Henley was the only one of the four players to find the green in two. Knox, McIlroy and Palmer all failed to get down in two, leaving Henley to hole from three feet for victory.  He climbed into the world's top 50 as a result of this win and qualified for the upcoming Masters.

In April 2017, Henley won his third tour event at the Shell Houston Open in Texas. He started the round four strokes behind 54-hole leader Kang Sung-hoon. Henley shot a final round 65 (−7), which included ten birdies and a double-bogey (ninth hole), to win by three shots over runner-up Kang. With the win, he secured the final spot in the next week's Masters and also a spot into the PGA Championship in August. At the 2021 U.S. Open, Henley held a share of the lead after the first, second, and third rounds. However, he faltered in the final round and shot a 5-over par 76 to finish in a tie for 13th.

Henley won the 2022 World Wide Technology Championship at Mayakoba for his first PGA Tour win in five years. He won by four shots ahead of Brian Harman, hitting a record-equalling score of 23-under par.

Professional wins (7)

PGA Tour wins (4)

PGA Tour playoff record (1–1)

Web.com  Tour wins (3)

Web.com Tour playoff record (2–0)

Results in major championships
Results not in chronological order in 2020.

LA = Low amateur
CUT = missed the half-way cut
"T" indicates a tie for a place
NT = No tournament due to COVID-19 pandemic

Summary

Most consecutive cuts made – 7 (2016 PGA – 2018 U.S. Open)
Longest streak of top-10s – 0

Results in The Players Championship

CUT = missed the halfway cut
"T" indicates a tie for a place
C = Canceled after the first round due to the COVID-19 pandemic

Results in World Golf Championships
Results not in chronological order before 2015.

1Canceled due to COVID-19 pandemic

QF, R16, R32, R64 = Round in which player lost in match play
"T" = tied
NT = No tournament
Note that the Championship and Invitational were discontinued from 2022.

PGA Tour career summary

Henley was an amateur.

* As of the 2021–22 season

U.S. national team appearances
Amateur
Palmer Cup: 2010 (winners), 2011 (winners)
Walker Cup: 2011

See also
2012 Web.com Tour graduates

References

External links

American male golfers
Georgia Bulldogs men's golfers
PGA Tour golfers
Korn Ferry Tour graduates
Golfers from Georgia (U.S. state)
Golfers from South Carolina
Sportspeople from Macon, Georgia
People from Glynn County, Georgia
Sportspeople from Charleston, South Carolina
1989 births
Living people